The Faceless Ones is the mostly missing eighth serial of the fourth season in the British science fiction television series Doctor Who, which was first broadcast in six weekly parts from 8 April to 13 May 1967.

In this serial, the Second Doctor (Patrick Troughton) and his travelling companions Jamie (Frazer Hines), Ben (Michael Craze) and Polly (Anneke Wills) arrive at Gatwick Airport where identity-stealing aliens known as the Chameleons have taken refuge after their planet was destroyed, preying on university students by abducting them using the false holiday flight organisation 'Chameleon Tours'. It sees the departure of Craze and Wills as Ben and Polly. Only two of the six episodes are held in the BBC archives; four remain missing.

An animated version of the serial from BBC Studios was released on 16 March 2020. It became the eighth incomplete Doctor Who serial to receive full-length animated reconstructions of its missing episodes.

Plot

The TARDIS materializes on the runway of Gatwick Airport. The Second Doctor, Ben, Polly and Jamie emerge only to discover that they are in the path of an oncoming plane. They see a security officer coming for them, so they split up to flee him. Airport security confiscates the TARDIS after thinking the police are playing a practical joke on them. Polly ducks in the Chameleon Tours agency hangar, where she sees Spencer kill another man and report to his superior, Captain Blade. Polly flees, and runs into the Doctor and Jamie. After telling them what she saw, she brings them to the hangar. They examine the body and the Doctor notes that the victim was electrocuted by a weapon that can't possibly exist on Earth at that time. They leave to find someone in authority, and Blade captures Polly without the Doctor or Jamie noticing. He hides her along with the corpse before Jamie and the Doctor return with sceptical airport authorities.

Alone again, Spencer revives an alien, a faceless green humanoid with prominent veins. Nurse Pinto brings in unconscious air traffic controller Meadows, and connects him to the alien and a machine. The alien transforms into a doppelgänger of Meadows, and goes to his airport job.

Polly exits from a newly landed plane, but rejects the Doctor and Jamie, claiming to be Michelle Leuppi from Zurich.

At the Chameleon kiosk, they meet Samantha Briggs who is searching for her brother. On a Chameleon youth tour, he sent a postcard from Rome, but nobody saw him there. Breaking in, the trio find fake postcards from missing tourists, and a monitor of the Tours hangar. The Doctor sees Ben find Polly suspended comatose in a metal cabinet, then himself gets caught and frozen by Blade and Spencer. The Doctor escapes and goes alone to the hangar and tells Jamie and Samantha to stay.

They meet Detective Inspector Crossland investigating the disappeared Chameleon customers, and realize the first body was his missing partner, DI Gascoigne. The Doctor finds only comatose Meadows and returns to demonstrate the freezing gun to the Airport Commandant, who gives them 12 hours to investigate. Blade points the ray gun at Crossland to stop him boarding the next flight, and shows him that all the passengers have vanished.

Spencer attacks Jamie and Samantha, but they escape. Jamie steals Samantha's ticket and boards. Samantha finds Spencer instead of the airport manager; he ties her up for Pinto to duplicate. The Doctor and Commandant learn from other airports that Chameleon passengers never arrive.

Blade eliminates a pursuing RAF fighter and diverts Jamie's plane up to dock in a vast alien craft. When an airsick Jamie emerges from the toilet, he finds the passengers miniaturised in drawers. Blade's assistant Ann catches him, and traps him in a room with two misshapen aliens.

The Doctor follows the radar signals to the plane's destination, threatens to remove alien Meadows' life-supporting black armband, and elicits an explanation. An explosion damaged the alien home world, so they want to use 50,000 humans left comatose in orbit as replacements. The Doctor uses the alien Meadows to get at the alien Pinto. She resists and disintegrates, so the real Pinto revives and frees Samantha. She tells the Doctor that Jamie left.

Jamie meets the Director of the aliens, a Crossland copy, who says the plane will return to the airport for the remaining Chameleons. The Doctor keeps the identities of copied staff secret, so the Commandant can find their hidden originals.

The Doctor pretends to be the alien Meadows and Pinto impersonates her double. They board the last flight to space. The alien Jamie reveals the threat of the Doctor, so Blade sends undisguised Chameleons to capture them. The Doctor offers to spare Gatwick's original aliens, when one onboard disintegrates, proving that Samantha found the real staff in parking lot cars. Blade and Spencer kill the Director and the fake Jamie, whose originals revive. Crossland stays behind when the Doctor, Jamie and Pinto return with freed humans.

In the airport, Samantha kisses Jamie goodbye. Ben and Polly learn that the day is 20 July 1966, when they first left in the TARDIS. They leave for home. The Doctor reveals to Jamie that the TARDIS has been released from airport storage, and stolen.

Production
Working titles for this story include The Chameleons. This story had its origins in a planned Hartnell story by Hulke and Ellis called The Big Store, in which aliens occupied mannequins in a busy department store, while waiting for human hosts to possess. The idea was adapted for the Troughton era and its setting changed to a metropolitan airport.

Some of The Faceless Ones was filmed on location at Gatwick Airport in March 1967. Heathrow also accepted the production team's offer, but the team chose Gatwick as the cost was lower. Doctor Who would later film at Heathrow for Time-Flight in 1982.

As The Macra Terror saw the debut of a new title sequence, The Faceless Ones saw the minor revision of the theme music that accompanied this new sequence introduced in Episode 2.

Cast notes
Both Michael Craze and Anneke Wills were released from their contracts after episode 2, leading to their departures during this serial. The characters appear in episode 6 in scenes shot on location prior to the studio recording.

Pauline Collins was offered the chance to continue playing the character of Sam Briggs as a new companion, but declined the offer. Collins guest-starred, years later, as Queen Victoria in "Tooth and Claw" (2006).

Bernard Kay appears as Inspector Crossland. He had previously appeared as Tyler in The Dalek Invasion of Earth (1964) and Saladin in The Crusade (1965), then later appeared as Caldwell in Colony in Space (1971). Donald Pickering and Wanda Ventham would later star as husband and wife in Time and the Rani (1987). Pickering had previously appeared as Eyesen in The Keys of Marinus (1964) and Ventham would go on to play Thea Ransom in Image of the Fendahl (1977). Christopher Tranchell previously appeared as Roger Colbert in The Massacre of St Bartholomew's Eve (1966) and would return as Leela's love interest Andred in The Invasion of Time (1978).

Broadcast, reception and archive

 Episode is missing

Paul Cornell, Martin Day, and Keith Topping gave the serial a favourable review in The Discontinuity Guide (1995), writing that "the realistic backdrop works very well, and the script is well constructed, augmented by the terrifying appearance of the aliens". In 2009, Mark Braxton of Radio Times noted that there were plot holes but the story "unveils its mystery with ease and elegance".

Missing episodes
Only episodes 1 and 3 of this serial exist in the BBC archives. In addition to the complete version, the archives also holds an incomplete print of episode 1, returned from ABC in Australia in late 1978. The print itself was given to ABC from a private collector living in Australia. The Australian Film Censorship Board removed the following scenes: Spencer killing Inspector Gascoigne with a Chameleon ray-gun; the alien arm emerging from the cupboard; and panning shots of the alien figure (seen only from behind) at the end of the episode. The missing scenes were later recovered along with the other copy of episode 1. A copy of episode 3 was returned to the BBC in 1987 from a private collector living in the United Kingdom. However, 20 seconds of material is missing from episode 3, due to damage to the print. A brief, 3-second moment of the impostor Polly brushing off a remark from the Doctor survives from episode 2. Two brief plane shots used in episode 4 also survive.

Commercial releases

In print

A novelisation of this serial, written by Terrance Dicks, was published by Target Books in December 1986.

Home media
As with all missing episodes, off-air recordings of the soundtrack exist due to contemporary fan efforts. In February 2002 these were released on CD, accompanied by linking narration from Frazer Hines. In November 2003, episodes one and three of this serial were released on VHS by BBC Worldwide, along with episode one of The Web of Fear, as part of The Reign of Terror boxset; this was the final VHS release, coinciding with the programme's fortieth anniversary. In November 2004, they were included in the three-disc Lost in Time DVD set.

A DVD and Blu-ray release occurred on 16 March 2020; this release included both surviving episodes accompanied by an animated version of all six episodes (using the original audio) in Colour and Black and White formats. Also included is the surviving footage from the missing episodes 2 and 4, and a photographic reconstruction of the missing episodes. This also makes The Faceless Ones episodes 1 and 3 the first live-action Doctor Who episodes produced in black and white to be released on Blu-ray, although due to the lower quality of 16mm film prints, they are not pure HD like the original film negatives would have allowed.

References

External links

Photonovel of The Faceless Ones, on the BBC website
Doctor Who Locations – The Faceless Ones

Target novelisation

Doctor Who missing episodes
Second Doctor serials
Doctor Who serials novelised by Terrance Dicks
1967 British television episodes
Doctor Who stories set on Earth
Fiction set in 1966